|}
Pamela Frances O'Neil (born 20 September 1945) is a former Australian politician. She was the Labor member for Fannie Bay in the Northern Territory Legislative Assembly from 1977 to 1983. In 1984, she was appointed Australia's first Sex Discrimination Commissioner by the Hawke Government, holding the position until 1988 when she was succeeded by Quentin Bryce.

References

 

 

1945 births
Living people
Members of the Northern Territory Legislative Assembly
Australian Labor Party members of the Northern Territory Legislative Assembly
Women members of the Northern Territory Legislative Assembly